Lee Da-hyeon (born ) is a South Korean female volleyball player. She is part of the South Korea women's national volleyball team.

She participated in the 2021 FIVB Volleyball Women's Nations League.
On a club level she was 2nd pick in the first round of the 2019-2020 draft, signing for Suwon Hyundai Hillstate.

References

2001 births
Living people
South Korean women's volleyball players